The UK Albums Chart is a weekly record chart based on album sales from Sunday to Saturday in the United Kingdom. It listed only physical album sales until 2007, after which it also included albums sold digitally and streams (the latter included in 2015). The chart is currently compiled by the Official Charts Company (OCC) on behalf of the UK music industry, and each week's new number one is first announced by BBC Radio 1 on their weekly chart show.

The definition of a "one-hit wonder", as given by the reference text The Guinness Book of British Hit Albums, was any act that achieves a number one on the UK Album Chart and no other Top 40 entry. However, when Guinness first published the list in the 1980s the hit albums chart was a Top 100 with compilations included, until being split at the end of 1989 into a Top 75 Hit/Official Albums Chart and Top 20 Hit/Official Compilations Chart, with a Top 200 artist albums chart being available to industry insiders from the 1990s. One hit wonders on the Singles Chart are artists with their number one being also their only Top 75 entry.
Since the album chart was first published on 28 July 1956, 17 acts have reached number one and had no other hit albums (Top 75 entries). Artists who have topped the album chart as solo artists but also charted as members of groups are exempted from the main list as well as those with smaller hits (listed separately).

One-hit wonders

Most recent one-hit wonder to be removed from the list: It Won't Always Be Like This by Inhaler (March 2023)

Artists with a number one album and a smaller Top 75 hit
The Guinness Book of British Hit Albums was first issued in 1983, six years before the Top 75 albums chart hit definition came into being (with a full Top 150 Artist Albums Chart being published for people within the industry at this time). As of January 2022, the OCC still track the number of Top 75 album hits on their website, but make available a Top 100 countdown to the public. The following list includes artists with more than one album chart hit who would have been seen as a one-hit wonder under the Guinness definition of 1983.
 Neil Reid reached number one for three weeks on 19 February 1972 with his self-titled debut album on Decca, after winning the 1971 series of Opportunity Knocks. He was the youngest person ever to top the album chart but success was short lived as follow-up album Smile peaked at number 47 in September 1972.
 Journey South hit number one on the albums chart on 1 April 2006 with their self-titled debut album (Syco Music) after coming third in the 2005 series of The X Factor. Follow-up album Home peaked at number 43 in November 2007.

Number one albums: One-week wonders
When The Guinness Book of British Hit Albums was last published in the 1990s, the list of 'number one albums with the fewest weeks on the chart' was based on the Top 75, with the shortest chart stay for a number one album being 5 weeks with acts such as Little Angels (with their 1993 album Jam), topping the list. In 2021, a never-to-be-beaten record was set with a number of albums debuting at the top and exiting the Top 75 the next week. The following is an update to the original 'number one albums with the fewest weeks on the chart' list but only lists those number one hit albums with one week in the Top 75 (as per The Guinness Book of British Hit Albums data):
 You Me At Six - Suckapunch (reached the top on 28 January 2021)
 Ben Howard - Collections from the Whiteout (reached number one on the chart of 08 April 2021) 
 The Wombats - Fix Yourself, Not the World (reached the top on 27 January 2022) The following week this album had dropped out of the Top 75 and was at number 96, and so would be still eligible for The Guinness Book of British Hit Albums list.

See also
List of one-hit wonders on the UK Singles Chart
Lists of one-hit wonders

References

External links
Official UK Albums Top 100 at the Official Charts Company
The Official UK Top 40 Albums Chart at BBC Radio 1

British popular music
One-hit wonders
UK Albums